Toyota Arena is an arena in Ontario, California.

Toyota Arena may also refer to:
Generali Arena, an arena in Prague, Czech Republic
Utz Arena, an arena in York, Pennsylvania, United States

See also
 Toyota (disambiguation)
 Toyota Center (disambiguation)
 Toyota Park (disambiguation)
 Toyota Stadium (disambiguation)